Syagrius (430 – 486 or 487 or 493–4) was a Roman general and the last ruler of a Roman rump state in northern Gaul, now called the Kingdom of Soissons. Gregory of Tours referred to him as King of the Romans. Syagrius's defeat by king Clovis I of the Franks is considered the end of Western Roman rule outside of Italy. He inherited his position from his father, Aegidius, the last Roman magister militum per Gallias.  Syagrius preserved his father's territory between the Somme and the Loire around Soissons after the collapse of central rule in the Western Empire, a domain Gregory of Tours called the "Kingdom" of Soissons. Syagrius governed this Gallo-Roman enclave from the death of his father in 464 until 486, when he was defeated in battle by Clovis I.

Historians have mistrusted the title "Rex Romanorum" that Gregory of Tours gave him, at least as early as Godefroid Kurth, who dismissed it as a gross error in 1893. The common consensus has been to follow Kurth, based on the historical truism that Romans hated kingship from the days of the expulsion of Tarquin the Proud; for example, Syagrius' article in the Prosopography of the Later Roman Empire omits this title, preferring to refer to him as a "Roman ruler (in North Gaul)". However, Steven Fanning has assembled a number of examples of rex being used in a neutral, if not favorable, context, and argues that "the phrase Romanorum rex is not peculiar to Gregory of Tours or to Frankish sources", and that Gregory's usage may indeed show "that they were, or were seen to be, claiming to be Roman emperors."

End of Roman Gaul

Despite being isolated from the surviving portions of the Roman Empire, Syagrius managed to maintain a degree of Roman authority in northern Gaul for twenty years, and his state outlived the end of the Western Empire itself, the last Emperors being overthrown or killed in 476 and 480. Syagrius managed to hold off the neighbouring Salian Franks, who were internally divided under kings including Childeric. However, it is known that Childeric had previously come to the aid of the Gallo-Romans, joining a certain officer named Paul in operations against Saxons who at one point seized Angers.

Upon Childeric's death in 481 his son Clovis succeeded him. While Childeric had seen no need to overthrow the last Roman foothold in the west, Clovis assembled an army, issued a challenge, and met Syagrius's forces. Few details are known of the subsequent clash, the Battle of Soissons, but Syagrius was decisively defeated and fled. His domain passed to the Franks.

As Edward Gibbon later wrote, "It would be ungenerous, without some more accurate knowledge of his strength and resources, to condemn the rapid flight of Syagrius, who escaped after the loss of a battle to the distant court of Toulouse." Toulouse was the capital of Alaric II, king of the Visigoths. Intimidated by the victorious Franks, the Visigoths imprisoned Syagrius, then surrendered him to Clovis. He died not long after, stabbed in secret according to Gregory of Tours.

Descendants
Despite the assassination of Syagrius, the family evidently prospered under Frankish rule. King Guntram sent a Count Syagrius on a diplomatic mission to the Byzantine Empire in 585. A member of the family, Syagria, made a large donation of land to the monks of Novalesa Abbey in 739. "The last known member of the Syagrii was an abbot of Nantua who was mentioned in 757."

See also
Last of the Romans
Neustria

Notes

Further reading

 

430 births
486 deaths
5th-century Gallo-Roman people
5th-century monarchs in Europe
Last of the Romans
Kingdom of Soissons